The  Krau woolly bat (Kerivoula krauensis) is a species of bat in the family Vespertilionidae. It is found in Southeast Asia, Brunei, and Indonesia.

Taxonomy 
The species specific epithet is in honour of the region in which it was discovered, the Krau Wildlife Reserve.

Habitat and distribution 
The species is found in Thailand, Malaysia, Indonesia, and Brunei. It inhabits the understorey of mature lowland forests, although it has also been found in logged forests and in montane areas up to an elevation of 1,600 m.

Conservation 
The species is very vulnerable to deforestation due to its need for relatively undisturbed primary forest.

References 

Vesper bats
Mammals described in 2007